Section 201, as referred to in shorthand, is a section of the Trade Act of 1974 (P.L. 93-618) that permits the President to grant temporary import relief, by raising import duties or imposing nontariff barriers on goods entering the United States that injure or threaten to injure domestic industries producing like goods. The provision is the analog of Article XIX of the GATT, which allows GATT contracting parties to provide relief from injurious competition if temporary protection will enable the domestic industry to make adjustments to meet the competition.

Enforcement 
Though Section 201 is rarely invoked, a major case involving the solar industry in the United States. In April 2017, Suniva, a solar module manufacturer based in Atlanta, Georgia, declared bankruptcy, and in within a week had filed a trade complaint using Section 201 as its primary basis.

References 

Specific

United States federal trade legislation
Foreign trade of the United States